John Ferguson (1919 - December 17, 2005) was an American sportscaster for the LSU Tigers basketball and football teams on radio and later television. He also called New Orleans Saints games, Cotton States League baseball games and the Southwest Conference football game of the week.

Biography
John Ferguson was born in 1919 in Louisiana. He began his career calling Cotton States League games in El Dorado, Arkansas in 1942. When World War II started, Ferguson enlisted in the army as an Army Air pilot completing 144 missions piloting cargo planes over the Himalayas between India and China, supplying B-29s for their bombing runs.

After World War II, Ferguson moved to Baton Rouge, Louisiana, and when WJBO-AM won the rights to LSU games they asked if he was available and he took the job. After the 1958 season, Ferguson took a break from calling LSU games to do the Southwest Conference football game of the week. Because of this, Ferguson was not the announcer for Billy Cannon's Halloween run versus Ole Miss in 1959. J.C. Politz was the LSU broadcaster from 1959–1960. In 1961, Ferguson returned to LSU and broadcast men's basketball and football games. For a time, Ferguson was also the play-by-play commentator for the New Orleans Saints. The 1983 season was his last year as radio broadcaster at LSU. In 1984, Ferguson transitioned over to TigerVision, LSU's pay-per-view television network for football games and Jim Hawthorne took over as radio broadcaster for LSU baseball, men's basketball and football. Also in 1984, Ferguson was awarded the Distinguished Service Award in Sports Journalism from the Louisiana Sports Writers Association. He retired in 1987.

Ferguson also served as the executive director of the Tiger Athletic Foundation. He died in 2005 at the age of 86 in Zachary, Louisiana and was interred at Port Hudson National Cemetery.

See also
LSU Sports Network

References

American radio sports announcers
American television sports announcers
Baseball announcers
College basketball announcers in the United States
College football announcers
Louisiana Tech University alumni
LSU Tigers basketball announcers
LSU Tigers football announcers
National Football League announcers
New Orleans Saints announcers
1919 births
2005 deaths
United States Army personnel of World War II